The Mauritius Olympic Committee (IOC code: MRI) is the National Olympic Committee representing Mauritius.

See also
Mauritius at the Olympics
Mauritius at the Commonwealth Games

External links
Mauritius Olympic Committee Official site

Mauritius
 
Olympics
Sports organizations established in 1971